David Michael Green (10 November 1939 – 19 March 2016) was a Welsh first-class cricketer who played for Oxford University, Lancashire and Gloucestershire.

Green was born at Llanengan, Caernarfonshire, in Wales. A fair-haired right-handed batsman often used as an opener and a medium-pace bowler, he went to Brasenose College, Oxford, from Manchester Grammar School and was a regular and successful player for three years from 1959 to 1961, turning out for Lancashire in his holidays. He scored 1,000 runs in his first season, but failed to do so in his other two university seasons, and again in 1962, when he played fairly often for Lancashire.

After a year away playing in league cricket in 1963, he came back to Lancashire in 1964 and was a regular in the first team for three seasons. In 1965, with the benefit of playing in 35 first-class matches, he set a record that is unlikely ever to be beaten by scoring more than 2,000 runs without a single century: his highest for the season was 85. The previous highest number of runs in a season without a century was 1,709 by C.B. Harris in 1935, whilst not since 1970 has anyone scored 1,500 runs with no centuries in one season. After a more moderate season in 1966, he was injured and drifted out of the side in 1967, and was allowed to leave Lancashire at the end of the season to join Gloucestershire.

Green's aggressive batting in 1968 for his new county had him belatedly touted as a possible England opener: he scored 2,137 runs at an average of more than 40 runs per innings. In the event, the only honour he received was to be selected as a Wisden Cricketer of the Year in 1969. After two more modest seasons in 1969 and 1970, he gave up first-class cricket for a career in business and journalism, writing on cricket and rugby for The Daily Telegraph from 1982 to 2009.

He also played rugby union for Sale R.F.C.

Green died on 19 March 2016, at the age of 76.

References

External links
 
 Telegraph obituary

1939 births
2016 deaths
Welsh cricketers
Oxford University cricketers
Lancashire cricketers
Gloucestershire cricketers
International Cavaliers cricketers
Wisden Cricketers of the Year
People educated at Manchester Grammar School
Alumni of Brasenose College, Oxford
Marylebone Cricket Club cricketers
T. N. Pearce's XI cricketers
Marylebone Cricket Club President's XI cricketers